René Sieffert (4 August 1923 – 13 February 2004) was a French japanologist, professor at the Institut national des langues et civilisations orientales (INALCO).

René Sieffert translated many works and helped bring Japanese literature to French-speaking readers. Also, in 1971, when he was president of INALCO, he created with his wife Simone, the university press  (POF).

Bibliography

Works 
Main publications:
 La Littérature japonaise  
 Les Religions du Japon, 
 Treize siècles de lettres japonaises (2 vol.),  
 Le Japon et la France : images d'une découverte,  
 Théâtre classique,

Translations 
Some major translations:
 Le Dit de Hôgen (Hōgen Monogatari, Le Dit de Heiji (Heiji Monogatari), (Publications orientalistes de France, series "".
1997: , Publications orientalistes de France, series "Le Cycle Épique des Taïra et des Minamoto" - 
1988:  de dame Murasaki Shikibu - 
 Les Belles Endormies (The House of the Sleeping Beauties) by Yasunari Kawabata
1977: Éloge de l'ombre (In Praise of Shadows) by Tanizaki Jun'ichirô, Publications orientalistes de France
1986: Contes d'Uji, Publications orientalistes de France, series "Les œuvres capitales de la littérature japonaise"
1993: , Publications orientalistes de France, series "Tama"
1997: Le Journal de Tosa (土佐日記, Tosa nikki), Publications orientalistes de France, series "Tama"
1960: La tradition secrète du nô, followed by Une journée de nô, éd. Gallimard-Unesco, series "Connaissance de l'Orient"
1997: Contes de pluie et de lune (Ugetsu Monogatari) by Ueda Akinari, Gallimard-Unesco, series "Connaissance de l'Orient".

External links 
  "René Sieffert, Japanologist who translated the 'Ten Thousand Leaves' of the Man'yōshū" by  Kirkup, James, Independent (London). April 17, 2004.
 List of translations
 Notice on E. Universalis

French Japanologists
Translators from Japanese
University of Strasbourg alumni
Academic staff of the School for Advanced Studies in the Social Sciences
1923 births
People from Moselle (department)
2004 deaths
20th-century French translators